Huachuca National Forest was established as the Huachuca Forest Reserve by the U.S. Forest Service in Arizona on November 6, 1906 with 314,125 acres.  It became a National Forest on March 4, 1907. On July 1, 1908 the entire forest was combined with Baboquivari National Forest and Tumacacori National Forest to establish Garces National Forest, and the name was discontinued.  The lands are presently included in Coronado National Forest.

References

External links
 Forest History Society
 Forest History Society: Listing of the National Forests of the United States Text from Davis, Richard C., ed. Encyclopedia of American Forest and Conservation History. New York: Macmillan Publishing Company for the Forest History Society, 1983. Vol. II, pp. 743–788.

Former National Forests of Arizona
Coronado National Forest
Protected areas established in 1906
1906 establishments in Arizona Territory
1908 disestablishments in Arizona Territory
Protected areas disestablished in 1908